The peceta (pl. pecetes) was a unit of currency in Catalonia until 1850, when the whole of Spain decimalized. It was also a name used throughout Spain for an amount of four reales de vellón. It was coined in Barcelona in gold and silver from 1808 until 1814, under the Napoleonic government.

In Catalonia, the peceta was subdivided into 6 sous, each of 4 quarts (also spelled cuartos in Spanish), 8 xavos or 12 diners. Five pecetes were equal to one duro, which was itself equal to the Spanish 8 reales de plata fuerte (Spanish dollar). In the new, decimal currency, the peseta was worth 4 reales.

The name peseta reappeared in 1868 for the new Spanish currency. Its value was equivalent to that of the earlier peseta.

Etymology

The name of the currency comes from the catalan diminutive form of the word peça (piece) synonym of coin.

References

Economy of Catalonia
Modern obsolete currencies
Currencies of Spain
History of Catalonia
1850 disestablishments